is a Japanese manga artist.

He was born in Niihama, Ehime. After graduating from high school in 1955, he started working at a factory in Osaka making car parts but quit after only ten months.  He studied manga via a mail-offered course and wrote to various manga magazines.  In 1958, came his first commercially printed work Fukumenhakushi (覆面博士) and he began his career as a manga artist.

He is best known for Nippon Keibaden that detailed the history of Japan's horse racing industry and its horses.  He is also known for beautiful amazon-like heroines who are never daunted by the hardship they endure.  Since 1970, he has written a series of works titled Sasori, lit. scorpion, which is the name for a female inmate and heroine. Director Shunya Ito started a series of ten films starring Meiko Kaji based on the manga. However, Ito withdrew from the project after three, and Kaji four films. Many of his works have been turned into movies since 1972.

List of works
 Fukumen Hakushi (覆面博士)
 Mehyo Mako (女豹マコ)
 Zubeko Tantei Ran (ズベ公探偵ラン)
 Nippon Keibaden (にっぽん競馬伝)
 Teinen Shokun (定年諸君)
 Toko (陶子)
 Kariudobachi (狩人蜂)
 Sasori (さそり)
 Kauchi Zankyoden Shamo (河内残侠伝軍鶏)
 Yadokari (やどかり)
 Onna Toji Sayaka (女刀師サヤカ)
 Garando (がらんどう)
 Zero-ka no Onna (O課の女)
 Yakochu (夜光虫)
 Wanibunsho / 82-bunsho (ワニ分署 / 82分署)
 Keiji Anko (刑事あんこう)
 Shokuchuka (食虫花)
 Hikuidori (火喰鳥)
 Ginsasa (銀笹)
 Suna (砂)
 Onna Shiokinin ZEBRA (女仕置き人ZEBRA)

References

External links
 Toru Shinohara manga at Media Arts Database 

Manga artists from Ehime Prefecture
Living people
1936 births
People from Niihama, Ehime